Christian Jiménez Bundo (born 2 July 1988 in Barcelona), known professionally as Porta, is a Spanish rapper. He achieved his initial popularity primarily over the Internet, distributing his music directly to fans on social media networks rather than relying on traditional record labels. His 2006 demo No es Cuestión de Edades ("It's not a matter of age") followed by No Hay Truco ("There is no Trick [to it]") in 2007 quickly became underground hits with record-breaking downloads. Porta rose to mainstream popularity with his first studio album En Boca de Tantos ("Talked About by So Many"), released in 2008 by Universal Music Group. Trastorno Bipolar ("Bipolar Disorder") was released in 2009 but failed to match the success of En Boca de Tantos. Porta separated himself from UMG in August 2011 after mounting disagreements. He released Reset on 7 May 2012 after signing with PIAS Spain. The album was a widespread success with positive public reception. Algo ha Cambiado ("Something's Changed") was released on 10 June 2014 in physical format in Spain and digitally worldwide. No Hay Truco remains Porta's most downloaded album.

Musical career

2006-2008: Beginnings and popularity 
When he joined Lebuqe. In March 2006 Porta launch their first LP under the name is not a matter of age produced and recorded at Soma Studios Lebuqe.5 This model was published in April under Creative Commons license on multiple pages web of free downloads, including MySpace.4 is 6 Recording harvest in few days a lot of downloads, 3 reaching the number 1 position in HHGroups7 to get five million downloads and gained fame throughout Spain. There was much controversy for many of his lyrics. In the song "Las niñas de hoy en día son todas unas..." Porta describes women as "easy" generating much controversy. With "Cosas de la vida" Porta a new era begins trying to ingest love rap, which was criticized by those who like only Rap Hardcore but was greeted positively by good words and feelings it conveys. Porta also belonged to a rap group called "Rap Comando" which had as members a Porta, DJ Datz, h0lynaight, and Bazzel Chus. Porta participated in the Ready to give the blow that never came to light that year although some issues of this EP, songs like "Sobran las presentaciones" and "Mas que un sentimiento" out model.

No hay truco was launched in January 2007, and quickly gained more than 5 million downloads thus removing the first position to its first LP called "No es cuestión de edades". Just a few months later, his Myspace profile becomes the second space themed musical that most visited portal on Spain.5 Its two LP have received more than 13 million downloads and profile has been viewed more than 20 million times. Until today "No Hay Truco" is the most downloaded LP in the history of rap . With the great success of their second LP, the controversy surrounding Porta grew even more, especially when I was called no catch as best model of the year. Although Porta always said he did not have to be taken very seriously his lyrics about women, he was not a macho man, who only made the song because it was something that was happening at the time, but still was attacked by the National Institute Women .
In the eighth song from the album, "Las chicas unas guarras, pero los tíos unos cerdos" strikes again women by treating of "easy " . This topic was the support of the rapper "May" on the contrary said that men were " perverts " . Aside from all the success they had achieved Porta generated considerable success to exceed 20 million views with his song "Hay Siempre Un Sentimiento Muerto En Un Corazon Roto" Another song that also generated a great success in the model and announced a world called Porta Dragon Ball Rap, this song was based on the series and how important it was for him. The video quickly became the third most watched video in the history of Spain in YouTube with over 50 million views. . Its popularity in the network opens new opportunities and is worth a record deal with Universal Music, who signed in November 2007.5 Universal Music is known as the home of some of the best rappers such as Eminem and Jay Z.

2008-2009: En boca de tantos 
In February 2008, Porta was again embroiled in controversy when the rumor that Porta had died of an overdose had spread across the network. In response to that an angry Porta launched as the opening theme song of her album "Resurrección" , which says that the more famous older were acquired envy and criticism when the music was still the same . That same year would have some clashes with some rappers especially against Aloy, who later face .

Their first album, En boca de tantos, was released on 19 February 2008 . He was received by critics positively and scored notable commercial success. It reached its second week the first position in the list of album sales in Spain and certified gold record (more than one million copies sold), having several singles that brought fame and success to the album, as "En boca de tantos", "Aprecia lo que tienes", "Sin ti" among others. Also includes the song all against me, in which he makes derogatory comments against rappers like Cadierno, Genioh, Cíniko, Heartbeat Catalan, Black -G, Raphael, Boby.PRO, Aloy, Versatile, El Kapo, Shotta, Santé and The Poet, among others. The video of the song that gives title track won the Sun Music Award for best music video at the Festival de Málaga, earning 10 million views.11 . Porta has achieved notable success with their models but this time it has been shown that is always going to beat himself getting more than 20 million Plays with her song "Sin ti" and more than 5 million to "Aprecia lo que tienes" . But not on this CD lacked the controversy ; Porta released a song with the name "El Fin del Mundo" generating much controversy but still got over 6 million views, thus obtaining a deserved Gold Record.Between March and May 2008, published a series of MySpace a series of 10 chapters devoted to Porta, this is the first series of Spanish production that appears in this network social.12 13 Getting a surprising success fulfilling the objective was to know more Porta. As a result, he gained new fans, achieving promotion PlayStation and Universal for the series . Later part of MTV's Europe Music Award which was held that year in England in the city of Liverpool being among the 5 finalists . Porta acted in concert "MTV Day" at the Palais des Sports stadium in Madrid in front of 30 000 people. That same day shared the stage with one of the best rock bands called Maroon 5. A biography of rapper Barcelona is edited with the title in June of that year, "Bounce" by Perez Sabia, Alba and Antunez, Juan Manuel in "Ediciones Martínez Roca". It was a limited edition that came out in 2008 alone, and all copies were sold in one week.

2009-2010: Trastorno bipolar 
The second job Carrier saw fame with a theme created 6 October 2009 and was titled Trastorno Bipolar where talking about the infighting between his Porta and Christian and the problems that people had where I was very successful on all for his topic "La bella y la bestia" with over 50 million views on YouTube for his song "Espejismos" with nearly 8 million views on YouTube with his song " Trastorno Bipolar " that had 4 million views but also had controversial by his song " Confesiones" which criticizes implying that God is an atheist.
The 24 August 2011, announced on his Facebook page that he had received the letter of freedom of Universal. Under his new record label, PIAS Spain. Since that year he starred campaign Energy Sistem .

2012: Reset 
On 7 May 2012 he released his third full-length album, entitled "Reset" achieving win the award for best rap album, hip- hop and urban music. The music disc frame shows the word "reboot ", which speaks of his artistic life and the" mistakes " he has committed, and start to fix them, before putting an end to his career rather restart. In MC Dj joaking collaborate, Skiller Zone, Soma, Jack, ZPU, David Trotsky, Shinoflow, Abram, h0lynaight, Isusko, Samo, SBRV, Fado, Chus, Gema, Dan, Eude, Aid, Genioh, Eneyser, Yesh, Xenon, Mr Currice, Mowlihawk, RM Endecah & Easter. It features 17 tracks, all these recorded, mixed and mastered at Studio Lebuqe.

2014: Algo ha cambiado 
On 11 June 2014 he released his fourth studio LP album titled "Algo ha cambiado" where he says he has changed his personality. This record has the collaborations of MC Gema, Eude, Isusko, Belen Alarcon, Holynigth and Eddie MV. It includes 13 tracks, all of them recorded, mixed and mastered in Lebuque Studios

Demo tapes
Sin prisa pero sin pausa (Slowly but surely) (Never published)
Dispuesto a dar el golpe (Ready to give the coup) (Never published)
No es cuestión de edades (It's not a matter of age) (2006)
No hay truco (There's no trick) (2007)

Studio albums
En boca de tantos (In the Mouth of Many) (2008) Universal
Trastorno bipolar (Bipolar disorder) (2009) Universal
Reset (2012, PIAS España) RR
Algo ha cambiado (2014, PIAS España) RR
Equilibrio (2016, Sin Anestesia)

Videography 
"Yo soy Porta" (I am Porta) 2008.
"En boca de tantos" (In the mouth of many) 2008.
"Sobre el famoso tema" (About the famous theme) (with the apparition h0lyanight/Naiara) 2008.
"Dragon Ball Rap" 2008.
"Sé tú mismo" (Be yourself) 2009.
"Espejismos" (Mirages) 2009.
"Segundos fuera" (Seconds out (feat. Santaflow, Norykko, Eneyser and Curri C) (2009).
"Trastorno bipolar" (Bipolar disorder) feat. Christian, 2009.
"Nota de suicidio" (Suicide note) feat. Soma, 2009.
"La bella y la bestia" (The beauty and the beast) feat. Norykko, 2009.
"Voces en mi interior" feat. Santaflow 2009.
"Palabras mudas" (Mute words) feat. Gema, 2012.
"Etiquetas" (Tags) 2012.
"Tras el cristal" (2014)
"Equilibrio" (2016)
"Bruce Wayne" (2017)

See also
 Spanish hip hop

References

External links
 

1988 births
Spanish male rappers
Living people